Elections to Wyre Borough Council were held on 5 May 2003. All 55 councillors were elected from 26 wards in elections held every four years. The Conservative Party kept hold overall control of the council. For this election boundary changes had taken place which resulted in reducing the number of seats by one.

After the election composition of the council was as follows:

Election result

Ward Results

Bourne

Breck

Brock

Cabus

Calder

Carleton

Catterall

Cleveleys Park

Garstang

Great Eccleston

Hambleton & Stalmine-with-Staynall

Hardhorn

Highcross

Jubilee

Mount

Norcross

Park

Pharos

Pilling

Preesall

Rossall

Staina

Tithebarn

Victoria

Warren

Wyresdale

References

2003 English local elections
2003
2000s in Lancashire